Clerkin is a surname. Notable people with the surname include:

Cavan Clerkin (born 1973), British television actor and writer
Dennis Clerkin (born 1950), American bridge player
Dick Clerkin, Irish Gaelic footballer
John Clerkin (born 1949), American politician
Michael Clerkin (1952–1976), killed by an IRA bomb